This is a list of seasons played by Melbourne City FC (W-League), the women's section of Australian soccer club Melbourne City since its creation in 2015.

Key
Key to league competitions:

 W-League – Australia's top women's football league, established in 2008.

Key to colours and symbols:

Key to league record:
 Season = The year and article of the season
 Pos = Final position
 Pld = Games played
 W = Games won
 D = Games drawn
 L = Games lost
 GF = Goals scored
 GA = Goals against
 Pts = Points

Key to cup record:
 En-dash (–) = Melbourne City Women did not participate
 SF = Semi-finals
 RU = Runners-up
 W = Winners

Seasons

References
 worldfootball.net

Melbourne City FC (A-League Women) seasons
M